Wola Chruścińska  is a village in the administrative district of Gmina Łanięta, within Kutno County, Łódź Voivodeship, in central Poland. Actor Robert Więckiewicz was born and raised in the village.

References

Villages in Kutno County